Charles M. Eden (January 18, 1855 – September 17, 1920) was an outfielder in Major League Baseball. He played over parts of four seasons (1877, 1879, 1884–1885) for the Chicago White Stockings, Cleveland Blues, and Pittsburgh Alleghenys.

See also
List of Major League Baseball annual doubles leaders

References

External links

1855 births
1920 deaths
Major League Baseball outfielders
Baseball players from Lexington, Kentucky
Chicago White Stockings players
Cleveland Blues (NL) players
Pittsburgh Alleghenys players
Minneapolis Browns players
Indianapolis Blues (minor league) players
Grand Rapids (minor league baseball) players
19th-century baseball players